Many musicians have been murdered during their active career. Most of the musicians had been shot or stabbed to death. Some of them have received extensive media attention, including the murder of John Lennon in 1980, the murder of Selena in 1995, the murder of Tupac Shakur in 1996, the murder of the Notorious B.I.G. in 1997, and the murder of XXXTentacion in 2018. Others have received less media attention, including the murder of Bryan Harvey, who was killed during the 2006 Richmond spree murders.

Murdered musicians

Below is a list of notable murders of musicians.

See also
 List of murdered hip hop musicians
 List of deaths in rock and roll
 List of pop musicians who died of drug overdose
 27 Club
 Curse of the ninth

References

Lists of musicians
Musicians
Lists of victims of crimes
Crime-related lists
Death-related lists